George Spanach (born 1943 or 1944) is a Canadian football player who played for the Edmonton Eskimos and Montreal Alouettes.

References

Edmonton Elks players
Living people
1940s births
Year of birth uncertain